Daniel L. Weinreb (January 6, 1959 – September 7, 2012) was an American computer scientist and programmer, with significant work in the environment of the programming language Lisp.

Early life
Weinreb was born on January 6, 1959, in Brooklyn, New York, and was raised there by his parents, Herbert and Phyllis Weinreb. He had two brothers, Bill and David, and attended Saint Ann's School.

Education
Weinreb graduated from St. Ann's School in Brooklyn, New York in 1975. He attended the Massachusetts Institute of Technology (MIT) from 1975 to 1979 (starting at age 16), graduating with a B.S. in computer science and electrical engineering, where he and Mike McMahon wrote EINE and ZWEI, text editors for MIT Lisp machines. EINE made use of the windowing system of the Lisp machine, and thus is the first Emacs written for a graphical user interface (GUI). EINE was the second implementation of Emacs ever written, and the first implementation of Emacs in Lisp. Most of the notable subsequent Emacs implementations used Lisp, including Richard Stallman's GNU Emacs, James Gosling's Gosmacs, and Bernard Greenberg's Multics Emacs.

Professional life
During 1979–1980, Weinreb worked at Lawrence Livermore National Laboratory (LLNL) on the operating system Amber for the S-1 supercomputer, more so the file system and the multiprocess scheduler.

In 1980, he cofounded Symbolics, developing software for their Lisp machine. He also participated significantly in the design of the programming language Common Lisp (CL). He was one of the five co-authors of the original language specification, Common Lisp the Language, First Edition. He worked on Statice, an object-oriented database published by Symbolics in 1988.

In 1988, he cofounded Object Design, Incorporated (ODI), where he was one of the architects and implementors of ObjectStore, a leading commercial object-oriented database management system object database. It is still commercially maintained and available from Progress Software, which bought Object Design (then eXcelon, Inc.).

In 2002, he joined BEA Systems, where he was Operations, Administration, and Management Architect for WebLogic.

In 2006, he joined ITA Software, working on an airline reservations system (ARS). In 2009 Daniel Weinreb gave a Google Tech Talk about the use of Common Lisp as one of the implementation languages for the airline reservation system.

In 2009, he was the chair of the International Lisp Conference 2009 in Cambridge, Massachusetts.

Personal life
Weinreb married Cheryl Moreau in 1986 and they had a son, Adam, in 1991.

Dan Weinreb died on September 7, 2012, after a year-long battle with cancer.

References

Publications

External links
 
 Daniel Weinreb's Road to Lisp
 Daniel Weinreb's Common Lisp Implementations: A Survey
 
 

1959 births
2012 deaths
Deaths from cancer in Massachusetts
MIT School of Engineering alumni
American computer scientists
American computer programmers
Google employees
Lisp (programming language) people
Emacs
American computer businesspeople
Saint Ann's School (Brooklyn) alumni